Spyridium mucronatum is a species of flowering plant in the family Rhamnaceae and is endemic to the south of Western Australia. It is an erect or spreading shrub usually with narrowly oblong leaves, and dense clusters of up to ten densely hairy, white to yellow flowers.

Description
The edges of the leaves are rolled under, enclosing most of the hairy lower surface. Flowering occurs from September to March.

Taxonomy
Spyridium mucronatum was first formally described in 1995 by Barbara Lynette Rye in the Nuytsia from specimens collected in a nature reserve near Cascade in 1992. The specific epithet (mucronatum) means "pointed", referring to the leaves.

In the same journal, Rye described three subspecies of S. mucronatum and the names are accepted by the Australian Plant Census:

Distribution
This spyridium grows in mallee between Borden, Frank Hann National Park and Cape Arid National Park, in the south of Western Australia, although not as far as the coast. Subspecies mucronatum often grows in the shade of Eucalyptus uncinata trees and is found from Frank Hann National Park to near Cape Arid National Park, subspecies multiflorum in the eastern part of the S. mucronatum range, and subspecies recurvum in the western part of the range, from Borden to Ravensthorpe.

Conservation status
Subspecies mucronatum is listed as "not threatened", but subspecies multiflorum is listed as "Priority Two" meaning that it is poorly known and from only one or a few locations, and subspecies recurvum as "Priority Three" by the Government of Western Australia Department of Biodiversity, Conservation and Attractions, meaning that it is poorly known and known from only a few locations but is not under imminent threat.

References

mucronatum
Rosales of Australia
Flora of Western Australia
Plants described in 1995
Taxa named by Barbara Lynette Rye